The 2011 Rushcliffe Borough Council election took place on 5 May 2011 to elect members of Rushcliffe Borough Council in Nottinghamshire, England. The whole council was up for election.

Overall election results

Rushcliffe Borough Council (Summary of Overall Results)

Rushcliffe Borough Council - Results by Ward

Abbey

Bingham East

Bingham West

Compton Acres

Cotgrave

Cranmer

Edwalton Village

Gamston

Gotham

Lady Bay

Leake

Lutterell

Manvers

(Had been delayed until 16 June 2011)

Melton

Musters

Nevile

North Keyworth

Oak

Ruddington

Soar Valley

South Keyworth

Stanford

Thoroton

Tollerton

Trent

Trent Bridge

Wiverton

Wolds

By-Elections between May 2011 - May 2015

By-elections are called when a representative Councillor resigns or dies, so are unpredictable.  A by-election is held to fill a political office that has become vacant between the scheduled elections.

Leake - 2 May 2013

Gamston - 20 March 2014

References

2011 English local elections
2011